Pseudaltha is a genus of moths of the family Limacodidae.

Species 
Pseudaltha atramentifera Hering, 1931
Pseudaltha eboris Solovyev, 2009
Pseudaltha sapa Solovyev, 2009

References 

 , 2009, Notes on South-East Asian Limacodidae (Lepidoptera, Zygaenoidea) with one new genus and eleven new species. Tijdschrift voor Entomology 152 (1): 167-183.

Limacodidae genera
Limacodidae
Taxa named by Erich Martin Hering